Ishwarganj is an upazila of the Mymensingh District in Bangladesh.

History
The seventeenth century was important to the development of Ishwarganj. The Bhulsoma Mosque was established in 1600 and 25 years after that, the Naluapara Mosque was also constructed.

In 1936, Pitalganj was established as a thana. It was renamed to Ishwarganj in honour of a patriotic boatman known as Ishwari Patni. During the Bangladesh Liberation War of 1971, six Bengali freedom fighters were killed on 16 October in a face-off against the Pakistan Army. On 9 December, Ishwarganj was liberated. Ishwarganj was liberated on 9 December 1971. The thana was upgraded to an upazila in 1983.

Geography
Ishwarganj has a total area of 286.19 km2. It borders Gaurepur Upazila to the north, Nandail to the south, Kendowa to the east, and Trishal Upazila to the west. It is 147 km from Dhaka and 24 km from Mymensingh.

The Kancha Matia River flow through the Upazila and meets the Norosunda River.

Demographics
According to the 2011 Bangladesh census, Iswarganj had a population of 376,348. Males constituted 49.75% of the population and females 50.25%. Muslims formed 96.78% of the population, Hindus 3.20% and others 0.02%. Iswarganj had a literacy rate of 41.01% for the population 7 years and above.

According to the 1991 Bangladesh census, Ishwarganj had a population of 306,977 in 56,296 households. 143,379 persons were aged 18 or older. Males constituted 50.8% of the population and females 49.2%. Ishwarganj has an average literacy rate of 22.2% (age 7+ years), compared to the national average of 32.4%.

Points of interest
Nearby places of interest include the Atharabari Railway Station, Luxmigonj Bazar, Mizebag, Mirzapur, Tarundia, Uchakhila, Boro hit, Sohagi Railway Station and Uchakhila Bazar.

Atharabari Bazar is the greatest Hat in Mymensingh. From the ancient period, Atharabari was famous for its Rayerbazar. In 2017 year, this bazar yielded above 2 crores in sales.

Khalbala Bazar is famous for its Jute market. Many jute godowns process Jute in Mymensingh. It has been known for Jute processing since the age of golden fiber.

Atharabari Zamindar Bari is known for its location, beauty, and prosperity.

At one time Ishwarganj and Uchakhila bazaar were famous markets in Mymensingh division for their jute and beef. Now, the bazaar is called the "Lexmigonj Bazar".

Administration
Ishwarganj Upazila is divided into Ishwarganj Municipality and 11 union parishads: Atharabari, Barahit, Iswarganj, Jatia, Magtula, Maijbagh, Rajibpur, Sarisha, Sohagi, Tarundia, and Uchakhila. The union parishads are subdivided into 293 mauzas and 294 villages.

Ishwarganj Municipality is subdivided into 9 wards and 13 mahallas.

Ishwarganj's Member of the Parliament is Fakhrul Imam. Its Upazila Chairman is Mahmud Hasan Sumon. The Vice Chairman is Aminul Islam Bhuyan ( Moni ) [BNP]. The female Vice Chairman is Shefali Hamid. [BNP]. Its Upazila Nirbahi Officer (UNO) is Hafiza Jasmin.

List of chairmen

Economy 
The economy in this region is mostly made up of agriculture, which accounts for 70.52% of income. 70,718 acres are under cultivation. Other sectors include business (10.22%) and services (3.84%).

Education

Ishwaraganj's educational institutes include:
 Ishwarganj Degree College
 Ishwarganj Bisweswari Pilot High School
 Abdul Khaleque Moksuda High School
 Uchakhila Higher Secondary School and college
 Ishwarganj Mohila College
 Atharabari College
 Alinogor Technical & Commercial College
 Atharabari M.C. High School
 Barohit High School
 Charjhithor High School
 Charnikhla High School
 Ishwargonj Ideal College
 Kasimpur High School
 Konapara High School
 Madhupur M.L. High School
 Maizbag Pas Para High School
 Mollik pur High School, (Laxmigonj)
 Moricharchor High School
 Postail High School
 Rajibpue AU High School
 Shakhua Adarsha Bidya Niketon High school
 Shohagi Union High School
 Tarundia Jagat Memorial High School
 Protishruti Model High School
 D.S. Kamil Madrasha
 Kazir Bolsha Dakhil Madrasha
 Mohespur Dakil Madrasha
 Pitambar Para Alia Madrasha, (Laxmigonj)
 Shakhwa Mozidia Dakhil Madrasha
 Uchakhila Keramotia S.A Madrasha
 Dhitpur High School
 Sree Nogor Dakhil Madrasha
 Rawlar Char Alim Madrasha
 Kumaruli High School
 Fanur Ashraful Ulom Dhakil Madrasha
 Madhupur abbasia DS Dhakil Madrasha

Notable people
 Abdul Hye Mashreki, litterateur, was born in Dattapara village in 1909.
 Fakhrul Imam, politician
 Md. Abdus Sattar, parliamentarian
 Shah Nurul Kabir, politician
 Zainul Abedin (politician)

See also
 Upazilas of Bangladesh
 Districts of Bangladesh
 Divisions of Bangladesh

References

 
Upazilas of Mymensingh District